Nemai Ghosh (8 May 1934 – 25 March 2020) was a noted Indian photographer most known for working with Satyajit Ray, as a still photographer for over two decades, starting with Goopy Gyne Bagha Byne (1969) till Ray's last film Agantuk (1991).

He was a jury member at the 2007 National Film Awards, and was awarded the Padma Shri by Government of India in 2010.

He died on 25 March 2020. He was 85.

Bibliography

 Satyajit Ray 70 ans; Photographies de Nemai Ghosh; Contributions éditées par Alok B. Nandi,1991, Eiffel Editions, Bruxelles.
 Satyajit Ray at 70 ; Photographs by Nemai Ghosh; Contributions edited by Alok B. Nandi, 1993, Point of View and Orient Longman

References

 Samik Bandyopadhyay. Nemai Ghosh: Portfolio. Seagull Theatre Quarterly, Issue 2, Apr 1994. pp 52–57.

External links
 
Nemai Ghosh: Satyajit Ray and Beyond. DAG Exhibition
Nemai Ghosh - a RAY of light. Documentary Film

20th-century Indian photographers
Indian movie stills photographers
Recipients of the Padma Shri in arts
Satyajit Ray
Bengali people
Artists from Kolkata
1934 births
2020 deaths
Photographers from West Bengal